GMR may refer to:

Transport 
 Gahmar railway station, in Uttar Pradesh, India
 Gambir railway station, in Jakarta, Indonesia (station code GMR)
 Georgia Midland Railroad, in Georgia, United States
 Glenreagh Mountain Railway, in New South Wales, Australia
 Golden Myanmar Airlines, a Burmese airline
 Totegegie Airport, in French Polynesia

Other uses 
 GMR (cryptography), a digital signature algorithm
 GMR (magazine), a video game magazine
 The Great Movie Ride, a defunct dark ride formerly located at Disney's Hollywood Studios at the Walt Disney World Resort in Bay Lake, Florida. 
 Genetics and Molecular Research, an academic journal
 BBC GMR, now BBC Radio Manchester
 Galápagos Marine Reserve, the protected waters around the Galápagos Islands
 General Motors Research Laboratories, a division of General Motors Corporation
 GEO-Mobile Radio Interface, a standard for satellite phones
 Giant magnetoresistance, a quantum mechanical magnetoresistance effect
 Giant monopole resonance, in physics, a form of giant resonance
 Glass Mountain Records, an American record label
 GMR Group, an Indian infrastructure company
 Golden-mantled rosella (Eastern rosella), an Australian parrot
 Great Man-Made River, an irrigation project in Libya
 Great Midwest Relay, now the Madison Chicago Relay, a 200-mile relay race
 Groupe mobile de réserve, paramilitary unit of Vichy France